Reuben Renwick Rogers (born November 15, 1974) is a jazz bassist from the Virgin Islands.

Biography
Reuben Rogers was imbued with both groove and spirit from birth. Raised in the Virgin Islands by parents who were both ministers, Rogers grew up playing gospel in church while absorbing the calypso and reggae rhythms of the islands. The discovery of jazz in his teens added the elements of freedom and improvisation to those innate qualities, creating the unique chemistry that would make Rogers one of the most distinctive and in demand bassists in modern jazz.

Rogers' versatile mastery of both the acoustic and electric bass has led to opportunities on stages around the world alongside some of the music's most renowned artists, including Charles Lloyd, Wynton Marsalis, Joshua Redman, Tomasz Stanko, Roy Hargrove, Marcus Roberts, Nicholas Payton, Mulgrew Miller, Jackie McLean and Dianne Reeves, among many others.

The range of styles and approaches represented by that partial list reflects the diversity and adaptability of Rogers’ virtuosic and communicative gifts. Whether laying down a window-rattling groove, painting lush harmonic colors or whispering with delicate lyricism, Rogers's passion and singular voice shine through in any setting. While he is constantly adapting his always-recognizable voice to new settings, styles and challenges, Rogers' career is remarkable for the longevity of many of his artistic relationships.

He maintains musical partnerships reaching back to his earliest mentors, and enjoys rewarding long-term collaborations with several other artists, including notable tenures with Joshua Redman, Charles Lloyd and the Aaron Goldberg Trio that have lasted for a decade or more. That blend of long-lasting relationships with novel encounters has led to an entrancing richness in Rogers’ playing, an evolution that is the extraordinary result of deep exploration combined with fresh surprises.

Over the last two decades, he has been featured on more than 100 recordings and countless international tours. In addition, in 2015 he released his first upright bass loop and sample collection, Reuben Rogers Volume 1. Rogers’ sole release as a leader is the 2006 all-star session The Things I Am, which features Redman, Payton, Goldberg, drummers Gregory Hutchinson and Adam Cruz, percussionist Kahlil Kwame Bell, saxophonist Ron Blake,
and guitarists Mark Whitfield and David Gilmore.

Embracing new challenges while continuing to evolve the profound bonds he has formed with his most long-lasting associations has provided such a rich avenue of self-expression that he thrives in his role as, to use his own joking term, “Super-Sideman.” Born in 1974, Rogers was always drawn to music and dabbled with the clarinet, piano, drums and guitar before discovering his true passion in the bass – a love of low end that he attributes to the earth-shaking sounds of bass-driven calypso and reggae that emanated from nearly every car driving around his native Virgin Islands.

His natural abilities were nurtured by his high school music teacher, Georgia Francis, who would continue to provide support and encouragement even after Rogers left the Islands to study at Berklee College of Music. He was introduced to jazz by saxophonist Ron Blake and drummer Dion Parson, with both of whom Rogers continues to work in the Afro-Caribbean tinged 21st Century Band, bringing his life and music full circle whenever he returns to the Islands. Both there and around the world, Rogers continues to give back with educational opportunities, leading workshops, clinics, private lessons and master classes to encourage the next generation of jazz musicians.

Discography

As leader
 The Things I Am – Reuben Rogers (Renwick Entertainment)

As sideman
With Charles Lloyd
 Rabo de Nube (ECM)
 Mirror (ECM)
 Athens Concert (ECM)
 I Long to See You (Blue Note)
 Passin' Thru (Blue Note)
 8: Kindred Spirits (Live from the Lobero) (Blue Note)
 Charles Lloyd and the Marvels + Lucinda Williams Vanished Gardens (Blue Note)
 Charles Lloyd 8: Kindred Spirits Live from the Lobero (Blue note)

With others
 Worlds – Aaron Goldberg (Sunnyside)
 Home – Aaron Goldberg (Sunnyside)
 Turning point – Aaron Goldberg (J Curve)
 Unfolding – Aaron Goldberg (J Curve)
 The now – Aaron Goldberg (J Curve)
 Song for Donise – Adonis Rose (Criss Cross)
 The Unity – Adonis Rose (Criss Cross)
 On the Verge – Adonis Rose (Criss Cross)
 The Exodus –  Anthony Wonsey (Alfa Music)
 Can't wait for perfect – Bob Reynolds (Fresh Sound)
 Testimonial – Carl Allen (Atlantic)
 Denzal Sinclaire – Denzal Sinclaire (Verve)
 A Little Moonlight – Dianne Reeves (Blue Note)
 Nouveau Swing – Donald Harrison (Impulse)
 Gifts & Givers – Jimmy Greene (Criss Cross)
 True Life Stories – Jimmy Greene (Criss Cross)
 Beyond – Joshua Redman (Warner bros.)
 Passage of Time – Joshua Redman (Warner Bros.)
 Mission Statement – Jimmy Greene (Razjaz)
 Compass – Joshua Redman (Nonesuch)
 If Less is More, Nothing is Everything – Kate McGarry (Palmetto)
 Dear Louis – Nicholas Payton (Verve)
 Sonic Tonic – Ron Blake (Mack Avenue)
 Alto Summit – Phil Woods
 What Lies Ahead – Peter Martin (Open Studio)
 December Avenue - Tomasz Stańko (ECM)
 Come What May - Joshua Redman (Nonesuch)
 Featuring Phil Woods, Vincent Herring, etc. – Alto Legacy (Key Stone)

References

External links
 Official website
 all about jazz
 

1974 births
Living people
American jazz composers
American male jazz composers
People from Saint Thomas, U.S. Virgin Islands
American jazz bass guitarists
American male bass guitarists
United States Virgin Islands musicians
21st-century American bass guitarists
21st-century American male musicians